Joshua Van Sant (December 31, 1803 – April 8, 1884) was a United States Congressional representative from Maryland. He served as mayor of Baltimore from 1871 to 1875.

Background 
Van Sant was born in Millington in Kent County, Maryland.  He moved with his parents to Wilmington, Delaware, in 1807, and later to Philadelphia in 1812.  He attended the common schools before moving to Baltimore, Maryland.

Career 
He engaged in hat making in 1817, became a journeyman, and continued that trade until 1835.  He was an unsuccessful candidate as a Jackson Democrat (supporting seventh President Andrew Jackson) to the lower chamber Maryland House of Delegates of the General Assembly of Maryland in 1833 and 1834, but served as a delegate to the State constitutional convention (version unratified) in 1836. He also served as U.S. Postmaster of Baltimore from 1839 to 1841, served again as a member of the House of Delegates in 1845, and as commissioner of Baltimore finances from March 1, 1846 to March 1, 1855. He was a trustee of the city and county almshouse (poor house municipal charity) from 1847 to 1853 and in 1861. He also served as a commissioner of public schools from 1852 to 1854, and later as president of that city Board of School Commissioners for the Baltimore City Public Schools in 1854. He is mentioned as the President of the (Baltimore) Institute of Music in 1856 (see "The Sun" The Baltimore Sun daily newspaper - 25 November 1856).

Van Sant was elected as a Democrat to the Thirty-third Congress, where he served from March 4, 1853, to March 3, 1855.  He was an unsuccessful candidate for reelection to the Thirty-fourth Congress in 1854.  He later served as a presidential elector on the Democratic ticket of John C. Breckinridge in pivotal crucial Presidential Election of 1860 which led up to the American Civil War (1861-1865),  and was delegate to the State constitutional convention in 1867 which created the fourth version and current state constitution.  He was director of the Maryland State Penitentiary (founded 1806) from 1867 to 1869, serving two years as president.  He was member of the board of trustees of the McDonough Educational Fund and Institute (for the modern McDonough School) from 1867 to 1871, serving as president in 1871, and member and president of the board for Bay View Asylum (later renamed Baltimore City Hospitals, then Francis Scott Key Medical Center, and today as Johns Hopkins Bayview) from 1868 to 1870.

Van Sant served as mayor of Baltimore from 1871 to 1875, during which time the current Baltimore City Hall massive construction project 1867-1875, was completed under budget and dedicated. He later declined to be a candidate for renomination.  He was appointed city comptroller of Baltimore in July 1876 and served five years until January 1881.  Afterwards, he was elected to that office and served until his 1884 death in Baltimore.  He is interred in Greenmount Cemetery off of Greenmount Avenue and East North Avenue in northeast Baltimore.

References

External links

1803 births
1884 deaths
19th-century American politicians
Democratic Party members of the Maryland House of Delegates
Mayors of Baltimore
American people of Dutch descent
Maryland postmasters
American milliners
People from Kent County, Maryland
1860 United States presidential electors
Democratic Party members of the United States House of Representatives from Maryland
Burials at Green Mount Cemetery